Dundee was a constituency of the House of Commons of the Parliament of the United Kingdom from 1832 to 1950, when it was split into Dundee East and Dundee West.

From 1832 to 1868 it elected one Member of Parliament (MP) using the first-past-the-post voting system, and from 1868 until its abolition for the 1950 general election it elected two MPs using the bloc vote system.

Politics and history of the constituency 

Winston Churchill became Member of Parliament for Dundee in a by-election of 1908 soon after losing his Manchester North West seat and retained the seat until 1922.

In 1906, the explorer Ernest Shackleton unsuccessfully ran as a candidate for the Liberal Unionist Party.

From its creation in 1832 the seat did not return a Conservative member until 1931 when Florence Horsbrugh was elected. Originally a Liberal stronghold, the seat was one of the first in Scotland to return a Labour candidate, Alexander Wilkie, who was elected in 1906.

At the 1918 general election both Churchill, still then a Liberal, and Wilkie were supported by the local Unionists, as well as their own party organisations. From 1923 onwards the Conservatives/Unionists and Liberals each ran only one candidate in the constituency. This was part of an unofficial agreement between the two parties at a local level, with the understanding being that their supporters would give their other vote to the other party's candidate.

Boundaries

The boundaries of the constituency, as set out in the Representation of the People (Scotland) Act 1832, were-

"From the Point, on the East of the Town, at which the Shore of the Firth of Tay would be cut by a straight Line to be drawn from the Tower (in Fife) of Mr. Dalgleish of Scotscraig to the Point at which the Stobsmuir Road is joined by the old Road by Stobsmuir and Clepington and the old Craigie Road, in a straight Line to the said Point at which the Stobsmuir Road is joined by the old Road by Stobsmuir and Clepington and the old Craigie Road; thence, Westward, along the old Road by Stobsmuir and Clepington to the Point called Kings Cross, at which the several Boundaries of the Parishes of Dundee, Strathmartin, and Liff meet; thence in a straight Line to a Point on the Liff Road which is distant Twelve hundred Yards (measured along the Liff Road) to the West of the Point at which the Newtyle Road leaves the same; thence in a straight Line drawn due South to the Shore of the Firth of Tay; thence along the Shore of the Firth of Tay to the Point first described."

Members of Parliament

Election results 1832-1868

Elections in the 1830s

Kinloch's death caused a by-election.

Parnell was appointed as Paymaster-General of the Land Forces and Treasurer of the Navy, requiring a by-election.

Elections in the 1840s

Elections in the 1850s

Elections in the 1860s

Seat increased to two members

Election results 1873-1918

Elections in the 1870s
Armitstead resigned, causing a by-election.

Elections in the 1880s

 

 

Lacita's resignation caused a by-election.

Firth's death caused a by-election.

Elections in the 1890s

Robertson is appointed Civil Lord of the Admiralty, requiring a by-election.

Elections in the 1900s

Elections in the 1910s

In 1918 Wilkie and Churchill were officially supported by the Dundee Unionist Party Association in addition to their own party organisations.

Election results 1922-1945

Elections in the 1920s

Elections in the 1930s

Elections in the 1940s

Sources 
F. W. S. Craig, British Parliamentary Election Results 1832 - 1885
F. W. S. Craig, British Parliamentary Election Results 1918 - 1949
Debrett's House of Commons and the Judicial Bench 1889

References 

Historic parliamentary constituencies in Scotland (Westminster)
Constituencies of the Parliament of the United Kingdom established in 1832
Constituencies of the Parliament of the United Kingdom disestablished in 1950
Politics of Dundee